Mourning Widows is an album by Mourning Widows, a project led by former Extreme guitarist Nuno Bettencourt.  The album was first released by Polydor Records in Japan and later in the United States.

Track listing
All tracks written by Nuno Bettencourt, except where noted.
 "All Automatic" – 6:53
 "Paint the Town Red" – 4:54
 "The Temp" – 4:33
 "The Air You That You Breathe" – 4:40
 "I Wanna Be Your Friend" – 7:07
 "Hotel Asylum" – 5:52
 "Over & Out" – 4:50
 "Love Is a Cigarette" – 6:18
 "Too Late" – 5:02
 "True Love in the Galaxy" (Bettencourt, Anthony J. Resta) – 6:55
 "Sex In a Jar" (demo) – 5:41
 "And the Winner is..." (demo) – 5:23

Personnel
 Nuno Bettencourt – guitars, vocals, producer
 Donovan Bettencourt – bass
 "Billy Vegas" – drums (actually Bettencourt himself)

Nuno Bettencourt albums
1998 debut albums